Kamenitsa is a residential neighbourhood in the east part of Plovdiv, in Bulgaria. It is famous for its local brewery, Kamenitza AD.

Neighbourhoods in Plovdiv